Dom Edmondus Bernardini, born Augusto was an Italian Abbot of the Common Observance, he became general-abbot of the Common Observance between 1937 and 1950.

See also
Catholic Church in Italy

References

Cistercian abbots general
Italian abbots
1879 births
1955 deaths